Carex hirsutella, the hairy green sedge or fuzzy wuzzy sedge, is a species of North American sedge that was first described by Kenneth Mackenzie in 1923. It ranges from Texas, throughout most of the central and eastern United States, north to Ontario and Quebec.

References

hirsutella
Flora of North America
Plants described in 1923
Taxa named by Kenneth Kent Mackenzie